Most of the languages of Bihar, one of north India's most populous states, belong to the Bihari subgroup of the Indo-Aryan family. Chief among them are Bhojpuri, spoken in the west of the state, Maithili in the north, and Magahi in the south. Of these, only Maithili has official recognition under the Eighth Schedule to the Constitution of India. The official language of Bihar is Hindi, with Urdu serving as a second official language in 15 districts.

Exact speaker numbers for the main Bihari languages are not known because the more educated prefer to speak in Hindi (in formal situations) and so return this answer on the census, while many in rural areas and the urban poor, especially the illiterate, list their language as "Hindi" on the census as they regard that as the term for their language.

Other languages include the Indo-Aryan Bajjika, Sadri, Surjapuri, Bengali and Kochila Tharu, the Dravidian languages Kurukh (84,000 speakers in 2011), Kulehiya/Malto (76,000) and Mal Paharia, as well as the Austroasiatic languages Santali (almost half a million speakers in 2011) and Munda.

History
Despite of the large number of speakers of Bihari languages, they have not been constitutionally recognised in India, except Maithili which is recognised under the Eighth Schedule of the Constitution of India. Hindi is the language used for educational and official matters in Bihar. These languages was legally absorbed under the subordinate label of Hindi in the 1961 Census. Such state and national politics are creating conditions for language endangerment. The first success for spreading Hindi occurred in Bihar in 1881, when Hindi displaced Urdu as the sole official standard of the province. In this struggle between Hindi and Urdu standards of the Hindustani language, the potential claims of the three large mother tongues in the region – Bhojpuri, Maithili and Magahi were ignored. After independence, Hindi was again given the sole official status through the Bihar Official Language Act, 1950. Urdu became the second official language in the undivided State of Bihar on 16 August 1989.

Official languages

Hindi is the official languages of the State. Urdu is the second official language of the state.

Hindi

Recognised languages

Maithili

Maithili (Maithilī) is an Indo-Aryan language native to India and Nepal. In India, it is widely spoken in the Bihar. Native speakers are also found in other states and union territories of India, most notably in Jharkhand and the National Capital Territory of Delhi. According to Ethnologue, there are about 12 million Maithili speakers in India as per 2011 Census.
However, in the 2011 census of India, It was reported by only 1,35,83,464 people as their mother tongue comprising about 1.12% of the total population of India, as many Maithili speakers view it as a dialect of Hindi and report their mother tongue as Hindi.
In Nepal, it is spoken in the eastern Terai, and is the second most prevalent language of Nepal. Tirhuta was formerly the primary script for written Maithili. Less commonly, it was also written in the local variant of Kaithi. Today it is written in the Devanagari script.

In 2003, Maithili was included in the Eighth Schedule of the Indian Constitution as a recognised regional language of India, which allows it to be used in education, government, and other official contexts.

Urdu

Other languages and dialects of Bihar

Angika

Angika or Southern Maithili is mainly spoken in Anga area which includes Munger, Bhagalpur and Banka districts of Bihar and the Santhal Pargana division of Jharkhand. Its speakers are estimated to be around 15 million. In addition to the Anga area, it is also spoken in some parts of Purnia district of Bihar. However, in Purnia, it is a minority language as Purnia has a Maithil majority. Angika is classified as a dialect of Maithili by George A. Grierson in the Linguistic Survey of India (1903), although its speakers often perceive it as a distinct language.

Bajjika

Bajjika or Western Maithili is spoken in eastern India and Nepal. It is considered to be a dialect of the Maithili language due to certain political bias despite being a language with a vast vocabulary, grammar Bajjika is spoken in the north-western part of Bihar which mostly spans the modern day Tirhut Division and thus is also referred to as Tirhutiya. In Bihar, it is mainly spoken in the Samastipur, Sitamarhi, Muzaffarpur, Vaishali, Sheohar districts. It is also spoken in a part of the Darbhanga district adjoining Muzaffarpur and Samastipur districts.

Researcher Abhishek Kashyap (2013), based on the 2001 census data, estimated that there were 20 million Bajjika speakers in Bihar (including around 11.46 illiterate adults).

Bhojpuri

Bhojpuri has several dialects: Southern Bhojpuri, Northern Bhojpuri, Western Bhojpuri, and Nagpuria.

Southern Standard Bhojpuri is prevalent in the old Shahabad district (Buxar, Bhojpur, Rohtas, and Kaimur districts) and the Saran region (Saran, Siwan and Gopalganj districts) in Bihar, and the eastern Azamgarh (Ballia and Mau districts) and Varanasi (eastern part of Ghazipur district) regions in Uttar Pradesh. The dialect is also known as Kharwari. It can be further divided into Shahabadi, Chhaprahiya and Pachhimahi.

Northern Bhojpuri is common in the western Tirhut division (east and west Champaran districts) in Bihar, and Gorakhpur division (Deoria, Kushinagar, Gorakhpur, and Maharajganj districts) and Basti division (Basti, Sidharthanagar, and Sant Kabir Nagar districts) in Uttar Pradesh. It is also spoken in Nepal.

Western Bhojpuri is prevalent in the areas of Varanasi (Varanasi, Chandauli, Jaunpur, and the western part of Ghazipur district), Azamgarh (Azamgarh district), and Mirzapur, Sonbhadra, Sant Ravidas Nagar, and Bhadohi districts) in Uttar Pradesh. Banarasi is a local name for Bhojpuri, named after Banaras. Other names for Western Bhojpuri include Purbi and Benarsi.

Nagpuria Bhojpuri is the southernmost popular dialect, found in the Chota Nagpur Plateau of Jharkhand, particularly parts of Palamau and Ranchi. It has been influenced more by the Magahi language than by other dialects. It is sometimes referred to as Sadri.

A more specific classification recognises the dialects of Bhojpuri as Bhojpuri Tharu, Domra, Madhesi, Musahari, Northern Standard Bhojpuri (Basti, Gorakhpuri, Sarawaria), Southern Standard Bhojpuri (Kharwari), and Western Standard Bhojpuri (Benarsi, Purbi).

Magahi
Magahi is spoken in the Magadh region in southern Bihar. Its heartland is Patna, Jehanabad, Nalanda, Gaya, Nawada and Sheikhpura districts, with the centres of Magahi culture being Patna, earlier called Pataliputra, and Gaya. In the west, in western Patna district, Arwal and Aurangabad districts, Magahi blends into Bhojpuri spoken across the Son river. Across the Ganga Magahi borders various dialects closely-related to Maithili. In the east, in Lakhisarai and Jamui districts, Magahi blends into Angika.

Khortha 
Khortha language is spoken in far-southern Bihar adjoining Jharkhand, on the Chota Nagpur plateau. Districts where Khortha is spoken include Aurangabad, Gaya, Nawada and Jamui.

Santali
Santhali is a Munda language spoken by the Santhal Adivasis in its heartland in Santhal Parganas in northeastern Jharkhand. As an extension of this population, Santhali is spoken by many people in Jamui, Banka, Munger and Bhagalpur districts. Many Santhali people were also brought to eastern Bihar (Purnia division) as agricultural workers, so large numbers are also found in Araria, Purnia, Katihar and Kishanganj districts.

Surjapuri
Surjapuri is a language variety spoken in Purnia division (Araria, Purnia, Katihar and Kishanganj districts), and adjoining areas of West Bengal, although it has been clubbed under Hindi in the census. In fact, it is more closely-related to Assamese and Bengali than Hindi, being the western extension of the Kamatpuri group of dialects like Rajbanshi in neighbouring Nepal and Rangpuri in nearby Bangladesh. In the west it blends with eastern dialects of Maithili.

Tharu
Tharu is spoken by many ethnic Tharu living in West Champaran district, adjoining Chitwan district of Nepal. It is heavily influenced by Bhojpuri.

Classical languages of Bihar

Pali

Sanskrit

Writing systems

See also

Hindi in Bihar
Bihari languages
Languages of India

References

External links